Torsin-1A (TorA) also known as dystonia 1 protein (DYT1) is a protein that in humans is encoded by the TOR1A gene (also known as DQ2 or DYT1). TorA localizes to the endoplasmic reticulum and contiguous perinuclear space, where its ATPase activity is activated by either LULL1 or LAP1, respectively.

Function 

The protein encoded by this gene is a member of the AAA family of adenosine triphosphatases (ATPases), is related to the Clp protease/heat shock family.

Clinical significance 

Mutations in this gene result in the autosomal dominant disorder, torsion dystonia 1.

References

Further reading

External links 
 GeneReview/NIH/UW entry on Early-Onset Primary Dystonia